Visitors to Chile must obtain a visa from one of the Chilean diplomatic missions unless they come from one of the visa exempt countries. Chile generally maintains a reciprocal visa policy with other countries.

Visa policy map

Visa exemption
Holders of passports of the following 92 jurisdictions can visit Chile without a visa for up to 90 days (unless otherwise noted):

ID - May also enter with an ID card. 
1 - For a stay of up to 30 days.

Citizens of  can apply for a no-fee tourist or business visa, or visit Chile without a visa for up to 90 days, if they are also in possession of any types of entry visa (excluding transit visas) issued by Canada or the United States with a validity of more than six months:

Citizens of  holding a valid US Visa, with current validity of six months, do not require a Chilean tourist visa (either Simple Tourism or Multiple Tourism or Multiple-Business).

Citizens of  may obtain a visa online.

Consulted visa process is not required for citizens of Belarus, Botswana, Burkina Faso, Central African Republic, Comoros, Democratic Republic of the Congo, Dominica, Dominican Republic, Equatorial Guinea, Gabon Gambia, Guinea, Guinea-Bissau, Ivory Coast, Kiribati, Laos, Maldives, Madagascar, Malawi, Marshall Islands, Micronesia, Myanmar, Nauru, Papua New Guinea, Philippines, Rwanda, Samoa, Sao Tome and Principe, Seychelles, Solomon Islands, Suriname, Timor-Leste, Tonga, Tuvalu, Uganda, Ukraine, Vanuatu, Zambia and Zimbabwe.

Diplomatic and service category passports

Holders of diplomatic or service category passports of Bangladesh, Belarus, Botswana, China, Dominica, Dominican Republic, Egypt, India, Jordan, Kyrgyzstan, Mongolia, Morocco, Philippines, Sri Lanka, Suriname, Tunisia, Tuvalu and Venezuela do not require a visa.

Holders of diplomatic or service category passports of Antigua and Barbuda, Australia, Bahamas, Bolivia, Fiji, Mauritius, North Macedonia, Saint Lucia, San Marino, South Africa, Trinidad and Tobago and United States require a visa.

Agreement with Bolivia was denounced on 4 August 2016 and not applied from 4 February 2017.

Chile signed visa waiver agreements for holders of diplomatic, special and official passports with the following countries which are yet to come into force:
Armenia in April 2018, 
Azerbaijan in September 2018,

APEC Business Travel Card
Holders of passports issued by the following countries who possess an APEC Business Travel Card (ABTC) containing the "CHL" code on the reverse that it is valid for travel to Chile can enter visa-free for business trips for up to 90 days.

ABTCs are issued to nationals of:

Visa extension

If a holder of a tourist visa wishes to extend their Visa, they can do so at Chile's Extranjería Department and there is a charge of $100 USD. Another way of extending your tourist visa is to leave the country and come back in. This can only be done twice in succession. There is no fee to do so.

Visitor statistics
Most visitors arriving to Chile were from the following countries of nationality:

See also

Visa requirements for Chilean citizens

References

Chile
Foreign relations of Chile